John Summers may refer to:

John W. Summers (1870–1937), U.S. politician
John Summers (figure skater) (born 1957), American ice dancer
John Summers (footballer) (1915–1991), English footballer who played for Leicester City, Derby County and Southampton
John Summers (sport shooter) (born 1957), Australian Olympic sport shooter
John Summers & Sons, UK steel and iron producers
John Summers (RAF officer) (1894–?), World War I flying ace
John "Dick" Summers (1887–1976), old-time fiddler from Indiana
John Summers (bowls), Scottish lawn and indoor bowler
John Summers (Tennessee politician) from Metropolitan Council
John Summers (curler) in the 2011 World Senior Curling Championships – Men's tournament

See also
John Summers High School, Deeside, Flintshire, North Wales, UK
Johnny Summers (disambiguation)
John Sommers, American football
John Somers (disambiguation)